Oh, No! It's Devo is the fifth studio album by American new wave band Devo, released on 	October 21, 1982 by Warner Bros. Records. The album was recorded over a period of four months, between May and September 1982, at Cherokee Studios in Los Angeles. By the time of its release, Devo were a full-fledged synth-pop act, with guitar-based new wave sounds pushed more towards the background. Most of the music on Oh, No! It's Devo was created by electronic means, giving it a much different sound than the band's earlier studio albums, such as their 1978 debut Q: Are We Not Men? A: We Are Devo!, which relied more on guitars than synthesizers. This alienated some fans, despite the band stating since at least 1978 that their goal was to "de-emphasize" guitars. The album was produced by prominent producer Roy Thomas Baker, who had notably worked with, among others, Queen and the Cars.

Background
According to a 1982 interview with lead vocalist Mark Mothersbaugh, the album was titled Oh, No! It's Devo because "there are many people out there who, when they hear we're around again or have one more album coming out, that is their reaction."

In later interviews, Devo's co-founder and bass guitarist Gerald Casale stated that the album was born out of critical reviews in which the band were alternately described as both "fascists" and "clowns." In response, the band decided to make an album that would answer the question, "what would an album by fascist clowns sound like?"

The song "I Desire" brought the band controversy, as the lyrics were taken directly from a poem written by John Hinckley, Jr., who had attempted to assassinate U.S. President Ronald Reagan in an effort to impress actress Jodie Foster. "Big Mess" was inspired by letters sent to a game show host by someone using the name "Cowboy Kim".

Devo took on another new look for this album, wearing black T-shirts and slacks with white "Spud Ring" collars. In concert, these were augmented with Freedom of Choice (1980) era energy domes and New Traditionalists (1981) era shirts and ascots for part of the performance. The LP jacket had a cutout stand on the back so it could be stood up like a picture frame.

Promotion
Devo produced three music videos for the album: "Time Out for Fun," "Peek-a-Boo!" and "That's Good." All three videos eschewed Devo's previous narrative style for a basic performance against a bluescreen background displaying related visuals to the song. These were intended to replicate the band's intentions for the forthcoming tour for those who would be unable to attend. The video for "That's Good" ran into censorship troubles on MTV, as the juxtaposition of a cartoon french fry penetrating the hole of a doughnut and quickly cutting to a writhing, smiling nude woman, shot from the neck up, was considered too risqué for airplay. Band member and video director Gerald Casale later elaborated in an interview for the 33⅓ series book Devo's Freedom of Choice in 2015:
"We got this call from [MTV co-founder] Les Garland, He was like, 'Look, we know what you're trying to do here.' I go, What do you mean? He goes, 'Ya know, when that cartoon French fry glides through that cartoon donut and then it's with the girl looking happy. You can have the French fry, or you can have the donut, but you can't have the French fry and the donut, Otherwise, you can't cut to the girl.' And I go, 'But what about when the French fry hits the donut and breaks in half and she's sad?' And he goes 'Alright you little smart ass.' It was horrible. Then I go, 'What about that Billy Idol video you have and the girls are in skin-tight pants and their asses are full on in the screen and his head is between her legs and then somebody slaps her ass? What about that?' He goes, 'we're talking about you, we're not talking about them."
Casale eventually relented and made significant cuts to the video, which he came to regret, as "the song was going down in the charts, not up."

Track listing

Additional tracks

Personnel
Credits adapted from Pioneers Who Got Scalped: The Anthology CD liner notes:

Devo
 Mark Mothersbaugh – vocals, keyboards, guitar
 Gerald Casale – vocals, bass guitar, keyboards
 Bob Mothersbaugh – lead guitar, vocals
 Bob Casale – rhythm guitar, keyboards, vocals
 Alan Myers – drums

Credits adapted from the original album's liner notes:

Additional musician
 Annerose Bücklers – backing vocals on "Deep Sleep"

Technical
 Roy Thomas Baker – producer
 Gordon Fordyce – engineer
 Stuart Graham – assistant engineer
 George Marino – mastering
 Erik Arnesen – cover photography
 Devo Inc. – graphic concept
 Rick Seireeni – art direction
 Brent Scrivner – "Spudring" manufacturing

Tour
Devo's tour for the album was an innovative set up performed against a 12-foot, rear-projected video. Animated videos were produced for most the songs, synchronised to the music. For several songs, the band appeared to interact with the visuals, such as being kicked down by a giant pirate at the end of "Peek-a-Boo!", or shooting icons of unsynchronized dancing girls in "Out of Sync."

Later in the setlist, the screen would be removed to reveal Devo lit by moving lighting effects (Panaspots provided by Morpheus Lights). The Oh, No! It's Devo tour was the second concert tour known to utilize computerized moving lights, about one year after Genesis used 50 Vari-Lites (VL1's) on their Abacab tour.

The first show of the tour took place on October 30, 1982, at the Warner Beverly Hills Theater in Beverly Hills, California, and featured Wall of Voodoo as the opening act. It was filmed and transmitted live in 3-D to college campuses around the country, billed as "3-DEVO". This first performance was marred by technical mishaps: the backing track went out of sync during "Speed Racer," forcing the band to abandon the following performance of "Big Mess"; Mark Mothersbaugh's microphone cut out during "Out of Sync" and he was forced to perform the rest of the first set with guitarist Bob Mothersbaugh's microphone. In the second half of the show, the 3-D effects were ineffective and the band attacked the company providing the video twice: once during "Jocko Homo," with a series of cheap 3-D tricks (mostly snake nut cans) by Mothersbaugh; and once in a rant during "Beautiful World," delivered by the character Booji Boy. This concert was the only known live performance of "Explosions", which was cut from the rest the tour for unknown reasons.

The "3-DEVO" concert was later rebroadcast in a heavily edited version, omitting the technical gaffes and critical remarks. Both versions are available as bootlegs and several audio recordings of the tour exist in varying quality.

Setlist 
 "Time Out for Fun"
 "Patterns"
 "Speed Racer"
 "Big Mess"
 "Peek-a-Boo!"
 "Out of Sync"
 "That's Good"
 "Freedom of Choice Theme"
 "Whip It"
 "Girl U Want"
 "Planet Earth"
 "Explosions" (Removed after first two shows)
 "Deep Sleep"
 "Jocko Homo"
 "Mongoloid"
 "Uncontrollable Urge"
 "Gates of Steel"
 "Smart Patrol/Mr. DNA"
 "Gut Feeling"
 "Beautiful World"
 "(I Can't Get No) Satisfaction" (Only performed after December 12)
 "Come Back Jonee"
 "Devo Corporate Anthem"

Charts

References

External links

Devo albums
1982 albums
Albums produced by Roy Thomas Baker
Warner Records albums
Virgin Records albums
Obscenity controversies in music
Synth-pop albums by American artists